Nikolai Ivanovich Kulbin (1868, Helsinki – 6 March 1917, Petrograd) was a Russian Futurist artist, musician and theorist.

Kulbin first trained as medical doctor at the Imperial Military Medical Institute, graduating in 1893. He then became a lecturer at the Military Medical Attendants' School while also researching alcoholism.

He became an active artist and set designer. From 1913 to 1914 gave lectures on Futurism.

References

1868 births
1917 deaths
Russian Futurist composers
Russian avant-garde
20th-century Russian writers
Russian art critics
Russian composers
Russian male composers
S.M. Kirov Military Medical Academy alumni
20th-century Russian male musicians
20th-century Russian painters